ARRT may refer to:

American Registry of Radiologic Technologists
ARRT-Antenna
ARrt
Autonomous Rail Rapid Transit